Terengganu Malay is a Malayic language spoken in the Malaysian state of Terengganu all the way southward to coastal Pahang and northeast Johor. It is the native language of Terengganu Malays and highly localised Chinese Peranakan (locally known as "Mek and Awang") community as well as a second language among the smaller Indian minority. The language has developed a distinct phonetic, syntactic and lexical distinctions which makes it mutually unintelligible for speakers from outside the east coast of Peninsular Malaysia especially those who speak Standard Malay/Malaysian. Terengganu Malay still shares close linguistic ties with neighbouring Kelantan-Pattani and Pahang of which it forms under the umbrella term of "East Coast Peninsular Malayic languages". These similarities have often confused many people outside the region, who usually interchange Terengganu Malay with Kelantan Malay, even though there are major phonological and vocabulary differences between the two.

Terengganu Malay also coexists with two distinct but closely related Malayic varieties. In the districts of Besut and northern part of Setiu, the majority of the population speak Kelantan-Pattani Malay but in recent years many people from southern Terengganu started to migrate into these two districts and both variants now coexist with each other. In the inland mukim of Pasir Raja, Dungun, several villages still speak a variant of Ulu Tembeling dialect of Pahang Malay, locally known as Pasir Raja dialect. 

Terengganu Malay is considered to be the most recognisable identity of the state. This can be seen in many local television dramas, movies, songs, poems and religious sermons which emphasize the usage of Terengganu Malay. Radio stations in Terengganu whether public (Terengganu FM) or privately owned (Hot FM and Molek FM) mainly use Terengganu Malay in its broadcast alongside standard Malaysian. Recent years show an increase of awareness of the uniqueness of Terengganu Malay, such as the increasing use of Terengganu Malay in shop signs and recently the publication of a Hulu Terengganu Malay dictionary.

Names

The people from outside Terengganu often mistakenly believe that Terengganuans usually call themselves and their language Ganu; the word Ganu is actually how the Kelantanese and the people of Besut in northern Terengganu pronounce Terengganu and is rarely used by southern Terengganuans (Southern Setiu to Kemaman) themselves. Besides Tranung and Ganu, the people of Terengganu sometimes use Ganung, Teganu and Teganung as well.

Origin
There are several theories on the origin of the name Terengganu. Another story, said to have been originally narrated by the ninth Sultan of Terengganu, Baginda Omar, tells of a party of hunters from Pahang roving and hunting in the area of what is now southern Terengganu. One of the hunters spotted a big animal fang lying on the ground. A fellow party member asked to which animal did the fang belong. The hunter, not knowing which animal, simply answered  (Malay for 'fang of something'). The party later returned to Pahang with a rich hoard of game, fur and sandalwood, which impressed their neighbours.

Distribution

Terengganu Malay is natively spoken in most parts of Terengganu other than Besut and the northern part of Setiu. Besides Terengganu, it is also spoken in coastal Pahang, from Cherating near the border with Kemaman district to as far south as Mersing district in the state of Johor. A variety spoken in the village of Tanjung Sedili in the district of Kota Tinggi is said to be a mixture of Terengganuan, Johorean and several other Malay varieties, reflecting the historical demographics of the area, which once received Malay migrants from Terengganu.

Dialects

Terengganu Malay has two major dialects: Coastal and Inland. The dialect spoken in Kuala Terengganu district is the de facto standard dialect of Terengganu Malay. However, the most distinct of all dialects is Inland Terengganu Malay, spoken in Hulu Terengganu district Kuala Terengganu. The Inland dialect has a distinct phonology compared to the Coastal dialect. The most prominent difference is the pronunciation of the letter "e" at the ends of words. Coastal Terengganu speakers tend to pronounce it as a schwa while Inland Terengganu speakers tend to pronounce it with strong "e" (as in red) similar to Perak Tengah dialect. People in Setiu, especially in the northern part of the district, mostly speak a mixed Kelantanese-Terengganuan Malay due to its border with Besut, in which Kelantan-Pattani Malay is predominantly spoken, but Terengganu Malay in the southern part of Setiu and Kuala Terengganu use the more prestige form of Terengganu Malay. People in Dungun, Marang and Kemaman usually speak similar to those in Kuala Terengganu but with influences from Standard Malay and Pahang Malay as well (especially Kemaman). The people of coastal Pahang and the district of Mersing in Johor also use a Coastal variety of Terengganu Malay but with influences from Johor Malay. Natuna Malay spoken in the Riau Islands also has similarities with Terengganu Malay and is even considered a derivative of Terengganu Malay because the first ruler of Natuna, Datuk Kaya, was said to have been descended from the Pattani Sultanate that previously controlled the northern Malay Peninsula (Kelantan and Terengganu).

Comparison between Coastal and Inland dialects

Literature

Although essentially a spoken language with no standard orthography, Terengganu Malay is widely used in folk songs, poems, and also in mainstream and local media (such as local radio stations, dramas and movies). Ibrahim Taib, a famous Terengganu poet who was known for his usage of Inland Terengganu dialect in his poems such as "" ('Mom, I want to get out') and "" ('Enough Awang') is an example of a Terengganu Malay author. The song "" by famous Malaysian band Iklim was a hit song and is sung wholly in Terengganu Malay. "", a 1999 song composed by Suhaimi Mohd Zain and recorded by traditional singers Noraniza Idris and Siti Nurhaliza, contains an old Terengganuan Malay poem in the bridge based on the traditional Terengganu dance called . Another band called Spring also recorded a song sung in Terengganuan, called "".

Phonology
Terengganu Malay has a distinct phonology and grammar compared to Standard Malay. The grammatical order and pronunciation is similar but also distinct to those of the neighbouring Pahang and Kelantanese Malay.

Pronunciation

 followed by a nasal consonant changes to :   ('chicken') becomes ;   ('to eat') becomes 

 at the end of syllables changes to :   ('to ask') becomes 

 changes to :   ('house') becomes 

 changes to :   ('I') becomes 

 changes to :   ('here') becomes 

 changes to :   ('crocodile') becomes 

 becomes :   ('river') becomes 

 becomes :   ('knife') changes to 

 before a nasal vowel changes to :   ('Siam') becomes 

 changes to :   ('once') becomes 

 changes to :   ('person') becomes 

Final consonants are often only pronounced as a glottal stop.
  ('hill') becomes 

Words are distinguished by lengthened initial consonant.

Final  is silent. Example:  ('left') becomes ;  ('thick') becomes .

Example:  ('so many') becomes .

 ('moon') vs.  ('many months');  ('to strike') vs.  ('frog');  ('elbow') vs.  ('hand tool')

Vocabulary
Several comparisons between Standard Malay and Terengganu Malay with English translations:

Intensifier

Numerals
Numerals in Terengganu Malay are closely related to those of neighbouring Kelantanese Malay; however, they differ in pronunciation, particularly the final letter.

Animals
Most words for animals agree with standard Malay, differing only in pronunciation.

Notable Terengganuan phrases

 means 'really', a popular phrase used to show or express something that is really serious or true.

Example: , as opposed to Standard Malay or West coast Malay dialects: 

It is widely used by Terengganu people to wish other people well and to brighten their days.

 denotes two situations whereby one is totally exhausted or someone who is very weak.

Sample text

Terengganu Malay:

Malaysian:

English

'Kids today don't know about traditional foods, it's not just traditional cakes, even the rice as well, what can we do all foods these days are modern, younger generations don't want to learn always rely on old people.'

References

External links
Ensiklopedia Sejarah dan Kebudayaan Melayu, DBP Kementerian Pendidikan Malaysia
 Loghat Terengganu | Terengganu 
 Bahasa Malaysia Simple Fun – Terengganu Malay Language

Agglutinative languages
Malay language
Malay dialects
Languages of Malaysia
Terengganu Malay
Terengganu
Malayic languages